Muhammad Qavi Khan (13 November 1942 – 5 March 2023) was a Pakistani film, radio, theatre and television actor, director and playwright.

Khan has acted in over 200 films and some 1,000 television plays. 

Khan is best-known for his police drama serial Andhera Ujala, which launched him to stardom alongside his fellow actors Irfan Khoosat and Jameel Fakhri. Some of his other notable works in television include roles in Khaani (2017) and Meri Shehzadi (2022–2023). 

He was also a playwright, having written the autobiographical one man stage play Action and Reaction in 2011.

In March 2011, Qavi Khan's achievements were honored at an event at the Pakistan National Council of the Arts auditorium in Islamabad.

The Government of Pakistan honoured Khan with the Pride of Performance in 1980 and Sitara-e-Imtiaz in 2012 for his contribution to the field of arts.

Early life
Khan was born on 13 November 1942 in Badaun, now located in India's Uttar Pradesh, to a father who was in the British Indian Army. Following the 1947 Partition, the family moved to Pakistan, settling down in Khokropar, Sindh, before moving to Peshawar, where they would live opposite the Mahabat Khan mosque. Khan would get his early education there and later would work as a front desk officer in a Grindlays Bank before going to Lahore to pursue his passion of acting more seriously.

He married in 1968 and had four children.

Career

Radio
In 1952, he began his career as a child artist by joining Radio Pakistan Peshawar.

Theatre
In 1961, he was cast in Dagha Baz, a play written by Envar Sajjad and directed by Kamal Ahmed Rizvi.

Television
In 1964, he started his television career by being the lead in PTV’s first-ever play, Nazrana, in his career being part of some 1,000 serials.

In 1966, he appeared in PTV's black-and-white drama Lakhon Main Teen.

Films
In 1964, he worked in his first movie, Diljeet Mirza's Riwaj. 

In 1971, he started producing films, Mr Buddhu being the first of some 13 film productions, while he'd eventually act in over 200 films.

Death
Qavi Khan died from cancer on 5 March 2023, at the age of 80. Qavi Khan died in Canada and is now buried there.

Selected filmography

Films

Television

The list is incomplete. Some of his recent works are:

Awards and recognition
 2007 Lifetime Achievement Award by Pakistan Television Corporation
 2012 Sitara-e-Imtiaz by the Government of Pakistan
 PTV Award for Best Actor
 Lifetime Achievement Award by PTV in 2007
1978 Nigar Award for Best Supporting Actor- Film 'Parakh'

References

External links
 

1942 births
2023 deaths
Muhajir people
Pakistani radio personalities
Pakistani male stage actors
Pakistani theatre directors
Pakistani dramatists and playwrights
Pakistani male television actors
Pakistani male film actors
20th-century Pakistani male actors
Male actors from Lahore
Male actors in Urdu cinema
Nigar Award winners
Recipients of the Pride of Performance
Hum Award winners
Recipients of Sitara-i-Imtiaz
Deaths from cancer in Canada